Kaingaroa, also called Kaingaroa Forest (not to be confused with the actual forest) or Kaingaroa Village, is a small town southeast of Rotorua within the Bay of Plenty region of New Zealand's North Island. The town is the headquarters of Kaingaroa Forest.

Demographics
Kaingaroa is part of the larger Kaingaroa-Whakarewarewa statistical area.

Kaingaroa had a population of 402 at the 2018 New Zealand census, a decrease of 24 people (−5.6%) since the 2013 census, and a decrease of 81 people (−16.8%) since the 2006 census. There were 123 households, comprising 213 males and 189 females, giving a sex ratio of 1.13 males per female, with 117 people (29.1%) aged under 15 years, 87 (21.6%) aged 15 to 29, 162 (40.3%) aged 30 to 64, and 30 (7.5%) aged 65 or older.

Ethnicities were 23.9% European/Pākehā, 88.8% Māori, 5.2% Pacific peoples, 1.5% Asian, and 0.7% other ethnicities. People may identify with more than one ethnicity.

Although some people chose not to answer the census's question about religious affiliation, 48.5% had no religion, 28.4% were Christian, 11.9% had Māori religious beliefs, 0.7% were Hindu and 2.2% had other religions.

Of those at least 15 years old, 9 (3.2%) people had a bachelor's or higher degree, and 93 (32.6%) people had no formal qualifications. 9 people (3.2%) earned over $70,000 compared to 17.2% nationally. The employment status of those at least 15 was that 108 (37.9%) people were employed full-time, 48 (16.8%) were part-time, and 33 (11.6%) were unemployed.

Kaingaroa-Whakarewarewa statistical area

Kaingaroa-Whakarewarewa had a population of 1,887 at the 2018 New Zealand census, an increase of 6 people (0.3%) since the 2013 census, and a decrease of 15 people (−0.8%) since the 2006 census. There were 690 households, comprising 975 males and 912 females, giving a sex ratio of 1.07 males per female. The median age was 42.0 years (compared with 37.4 years nationally), with 402 people (21.3%) aged under 15 years, 324 (17.2%) aged 15 to 29, 903 (47.9%) aged 30 to 64, and 261 (13.8%) aged 65 or older.

Ethnicities were 76.5% European/Pākehā, 32.6% Māori, 2.5% Pacific peoples, 2.1% Asian, and 1.3% other ethnicities. People may identify with more than one ethnicity.

The percentage of people born overseas was 14.5, compared with 27.1% nationally.

Although some people chose not to answer the census's question about religious affiliation, 56.8% had no religion, 31.2% were Christian, 3.2% had Māori religious beliefs, 0.2% were Hindu, 0.2% were Buddhist and 1.1% had other religions.

Of those at least 15 years old, 336 (22.6%) people had a bachelor's or higher degree, and 243 (16.4%) people had no formal qualifications. The median income was $37,400, compared with $31,800 nationally. 312 people (21.0%) earned over $70,000 compared to 17.2% nationally. The employment status of those at least 15 was that 771 (51.9%) people were employed full-time, 264 (17.8%) were part-time, and 48 (3.2%) were unemployed.

Marae

Te Huingawaka Marae is local meeting ground for the Tūhoe hapū of Ngāti Kaingaroa and Nga Tipuna O Te Motu. The marae building is a former cookhouse.

In October 2020, the Government committed $461,159 from the Provincial Growth Fund to upgrade the marae, creating 8 jobs.

Education

References

Rotorua Lakes District
Populated places in the Bay of Plenty Region